Coalició Compromís, also known as Compromís, is a Valencianist electoral coalition in the Valencian Community, Spain. The parties involved include Més-Compromís, the left-wing Valencian People's Initiative, and a group of environmentalist (Greens Equo of the Valencian Country) and independent parties. Together they defend Valencianist, progressive and ecological politics.

Compromís was founded in January 2010 to participate in the 2011 elections to the Valencian parliament, and the 2011 local elections. Since the 2015 election year, Compromís has significantly increased its representation in many institutions. As of 2022, the party has 724 councillors all over the Valencian Autonomous Community, 17 parliamentary representatives in the Valencian parliament (Corts Valencianes), 1 representative in the Congress of Deputies of Spain and 1 in the Spanish Senate. In the past, it also had 1 representative in the European parliament. It also has 6 representatives in the Deputation of Valencia (València), 2 in Castellón (Castelló), 3 in Alicante (Alacant) and 84 mayor's offices, among them, the capital city of Valencia.

History 
In the 2011 Valencian election, Compromís received 176.213 votes (7% of the votes) and 6 of the 99 seats.

In the 2011 Spanish general election, running in coalition with Equo in the three Valencian provinces, it won 0.5% of the national vote and 1 MP in Congress (Joan Baldoví), nearing 5% of the total vote in the Valencian Country.

In the 2014 European Parliament election it won 1 seat within the European Spring coalition with other parties (such as Chunta Aragonesista or Equo).

In the 2015 Valencian election, Compromís polled third overall after the People's Party (PP) and the Valencian Socialists (PSPV). Compromís got 456.823 votes (18.5% of the votes) and 19 of the 99 seats. The election results allowed a new government to be formed by Compromís and PSPV, with the parliamentary support of Podemos. After negotiations, Mònica Oltra from Compromís was elected as Vice president of Generalitat Valenciana and Ximo Puig from PSPV as President.

For the 2015 Spanish general election, Compromís formed a coalition with Podemos, called Compromís-Podem-És el moment. This new coalition was the second most popular political force in the Valencian Country, surpassing the PSPV. They received 671.071 votes, 25,09% of the total vote in the Valencian Country. During the process of creating parliamentary groups, Podemos deputies joined the group within other Podemos deputies from all around Spain, while Compromís joined the Mixed Group.

In the 2016 general elections in Spain Compromís ran again in a coalition with Podemos, called A la valenciana ("The Valencian Way"), this time the coalition included as well United Left of the Valencian Country, the Valencian branch of United Left.

Electoral performance

Corts Valencianes

Cortes Generales

European Parliament

Notes

References

External links

 Official website of Coalició Compromís 

Political parties in the Valencian Community
Regionalist parties in Spain
Secessionist organizations in Europe
Green political parties in Spain
Valencian nationalism
Left-wing nationalist parties